Jimmywork is a 2004 mockumentary film written and directed by Simon Sauvé and produced by Atopia.

On the eve of his 50th birthday Jimmy W finds himself at the cross roads of his existence. For him it's now or never. The time has come to become rich and maybe even famous. Pretending to be an American Producer, he offers his services to the St-Tite Rodeo to develop an ad campaign to attract American tourists. Charmed as much by his demeanor as well as by his proposition, the Rodeo organizers call him in for a meeting to present his project. The meeting turns out to be a complete fiasco. Suspicious about Jimmy, they politely turn him down. Jimmy returns home furious and determined to get his revenge. Operating from his kitchen, he plans an elaborate scheme to extort the beer stock from the Rodeo valued at a quarter of million dollars.

References

 Variety Review

External links
Official site

2004 films
English-language Canadian films
2000s English-language films
Films set in Quebec
Quebec films
Canadian mockumentary films
Canadian comedy films
2000s Canadian films